The Richmond Sockeyes are a Junior "B" ice hockey team based in Richmond, British Columbia, Canada. They were named the "Sockeyes" by the original owner and longtime Richmond resident and B.C. hockey volunteer and leader Bruce Allison in 1972. Allison was motivated to bring top-level junior hockey to Richmond while also encouraging local players to play closer to home and stay in school. The first captain of the team was Richmond product Doug Paterson - who is one of the team's current owners. The Sockeyes franchise has had success as a Junior B team, and for several years as a top Junior A team in the PAC-A league and later the BC Junior Hockey League. The Sockeyes have won nine PJHL championships, six Cyclone Taylor Junior B BC Championship titles, two Keystone Cup National Junior B Championship titles, two Mowat Cup BC Junior A Championship titles (winners of the PAC-A Junior League versus the BCJHL winners), a Fred Page Championship as BCHL champions and a Centennial Cup as National Junior A Champions (both in 1987). They also won the Abbott Cup and Doyle Cup in 1987 - defeating Alberta and Saskatchewan Junior A champions on their way to a national title.

The Richmond Sockeyes currently play in the Tom Shaw Conference of the Junior B Pacific Junior Hockey League (PJHL). The Sockeyes play their home games at Minoru Arena in central Richmond. Richard Petrowsky is the team's general manager.

PAC-A and BCJHL (Junior A) history

The Richmond Sockeyes were one of the founding members in the new Pacific Junior A Hockey League in 1973-1974 along with the Nor'Wes Caps, Coquitlam Comets, Surrey Stampeders, Chilliwack Bruins, Kerrisdale Couriers and Vancouver Junior Canucks.  The Sockeyes quickly became one of the strongest teams in the Junior A league. As PJHL Champions, the Sockeyes defeated the BCJHL Champions in 1977 and 1979 for the Mowat Cup as British Columbia Junior "A" hockey champions.  In 1977 the Sockeyes lost out to the Saskatchewan Junior Hockey League's Prince Albert Raiders for the Abbott Cup as Western Canadian Champions after winning the Doyle Cup as Alberta/BC Champions.

In 1979, the PJHL merged with the BCJHL and along with it came the Richmond Sockeyes.  From 1979 until 1990, the Sockeyes finished first place in the league 3 times and won the league in 1987. After winning the league, they defeated the Peace Cariboo Junior Hockey League's Quesnel Millionaires 2-games-to-none to win the Mowat Cup. Then they defeated the Red Deer Rustlers of the Alberta Junior Hockey League for the Doyle Cup 4-games-to-3.  They moved on from there to beat the Humboldt Broncos of the SJHL to win the Abbott Cup and to earn a berth in the Centennial Cup.

They started on their National title quest by beating the Dartmouth Fuel Kids of the Metro Valley Junior Hockey League 7–3. They then lost out to host Humboldt Broncos 6–1. They pulled themselves together in the final game of the Round Robin to defeat the Central Junior A Hockey League's Pembroke Lumber Kings 4–1. The next day, Richmond and Pembroke squared off again, resulting in a 9–3 victory for the Sockeyes. This set up a Humboldt-Richmond final, their ninth game against each other in less than a month. The Richmond Sockeyes came out strong and pulled off a 5–2 victory to clinch their only National title.

In 1990, the town of Chilliwack, British Columbia bought the franchise rights to the team and created the Chilliwack Chiefs to make up for the Chilliwack Eagles ownership moving to Ladner, British Columbia. The Sockeyes reformed in the Junior "B" Pacific International Junior Hockey League.

PIJHL history
Richmond defeated the Abbotsford Pilots in the 1990–1991 PIJHL playoffs and then went on to beat the Nelson Leafs in the Cyclone Taylor Cup in two games.

The team won the Bronze in the Keystone Cup in 2003 after missing out on the title game based on goal-ratio.

The next year, 2004, they again won the PIJHL league championship, the Cyclone Taylor Cup provincial championship and this time placed 2nd in the Keystone Cup.

In 2009 the Sockeyes won the PIJHL league championship, they hosted and won the Cyclone Taylor Cup provincial championship, and the Keystone Cup.

In the 2010–11 PIJHL season, the Sockeyes won the PIJHL championship over the Abbotsford Pilots 4-games-to-none.

In the 2011–12 PIJHL season, the Sockeyes won the Regular season championship for the second year in a row. Due to numerous injuries in the playoffs and less than stellar play, the Sockeyes eventually lost the Tom Shaw Conference Finals to their rival the Delta Ice Hawks 4-games-to-2.

The 2012–2013 season was also Richmond's 40th year of operation. With the name change to the PIJHL in 2012/2013 to the Pacific Junior Hockey League(PJHL), the Richmond Sockeyes hoped for a better season than last year losing in the Tom Shaw Conference finals to the Delta Ice Hawks 4–2. The Sockeyes would have another outstanding regular season finishing first for the third straight year and fourth time in five years with a record of 32–8–4. The playoffs started with a 4–0 sweep of the North Delta Devils, followed by a seven-game series versus the Delta Ice Hawks. Richmond would end up dominating the Aldergrove Kodiaks in four games to claim their 9th PJHL title.

Richmond would then go on to the Cyclone Taylor Cup being hosted by the Comox Valley Glacier Kings and go 3–0 in the round-robin and face the Victoria Cougars from the VIJHL in the championship game. Richmond would end up winning 4–1 and book their ticket to the 2013 Keystone Cup in St. Malo, Manitoba.

After four tough games in four days in Comox, the team had only a couple of days of rest before flying to Winnipeg and boarding a team bus to St. Malo, Manitoba to represent British Columbia at the 2013 Keystone Cup – the Western Canadian Junior B Championships. Facing a daunting travel and game schedule that included six games in four days, the Sockeyes proved to be the class of the tournament. They went 5–0 in the round-robin and outscored the provincial championship teams from Alberta, Saskatchewan, Manitoba and Ontario by a total of 39–10. They faced the Saskatoon Royals for a second time in the final on Sunday, April 21. After a fast-paced first period, that ended 0–0, the Sockeyes depth and focused, persistent play once again led to some quick goals and a 3–0 lead after two. The big Saskatoon team battled hard in the final frame, but the Sockeyes held on for a 5–2 win and their second Keystone Cup championship in franchise history. The Sockeyes depth was again a big factor in their success in the gruelling schedule as valuable contributions from Jordan Andrews, Derek Hughes, Bret Higham, William Latimer and affiliate player Austin Adamson proved crucial. The Red Line torched the tournament and MVP Rudi Thorsteinson scored an incredible 11 goals in 6 games (after scoring 7 in the regular season). Thorsteinson led the tournament in scoring with 16 points while he, Jake Roder and Jeremy Hamaguchi combined for an amazing 39 points. Super rookies Danton Heinen and Daniel Lange also notched five goals apiece while veteran Stephen Campbell scored four. Dean Allison, the team's regular season and playoff leading scorer and team MVP in 2012-2013, and team captain Sam Chichak played exemplary two-way hockey, typically shutting down the other teams top forwards. It is worth noting that Allison is the grandson of the Richmond Sockeyes original owner, the late Bruce Allison. All of the teams at the Keystone Cup had some very talented players, but the Sockeyes two deadly power play units, stellar penalty killing and their ability to play all four lines and both goaltenders separated them from the other provincial champions. In total, 19 different Sockeyes notched at least a point in the tournament, and every player contributed with key shot blocks, face-off wins and strong, team-first play.

In the tournament, Richmond was able to outscore its opponents 44–12 and outshoot them 264–125. The Sockeyes have also been tied or leading a game for 871 minutes and 25 seconds in 900 minutes of hockey, which means they only trailed for 28 minutes and 35 seconds in 15 hockey games. The only times that the Sockeyes were down since game 6 of the Tom Shaw Final was in the first game of the Cyclone Taylor Cup to Victoria for 2:06, the gold medal game against Victoria for 24:10, and briefly to the Saskatoon Royals for 2:06 and Thunder Bay Northern Hawks for 0:13 in the Keystone Cup.

Season-by-season record
Note: GP = Games played, W = Wins, L = Losses, T = Ties, OTL = Overtime Losses, Pts = Points, GF = Goals for, GA = Goals against

Cyclone Taylor Cup
British Columbia Jr B Provincial Championships

NHL alumni

Karl Alzner
Jason Garrison
Danton Heinen
Matt Hervey
Dan Kesa
Scott King
Bruce Major
Kenndal McArdle
Doug Morrison
Raymond Sawada
Claudio Scremin
Rob Skrlac
Phil Von Stefenelli
Dave Tomlinson
Steve Tuttle

Awards and trophies

Centennial Cup
1986–87

Abbott Cup
1986–87

Doyle Cup
1976–77, 1978–79, 1986–87

Mowat Cup
1976–77, 1978–79, 1986–87

Keystone Cup
2008–09, 2012–2013

Cyclone Taylor Cup
1990–91, 2002–03, 2003–04, 2008–09, 2012–2013, 2017-2018

Fred Page Cup
1986–87

PJHL or PAC-A Championships(1972–1979)
1976–77, 1977–78, 1978–79

PIJHL Championship(1990–2012)
1990–91, 2002–03, 2003–04, 2008–09, 2010–11

PJHL Championship(2012–Present)
2012–2013

Most Valuable Player
Kyle Nishi: 2007–08
Tyler Andrews: 2017–18

Best Defenceman
Alex Koch: 2009–10
Adam Nishi: 2013–14

Best Goaltender
Brad Anderson: 2007–08
Sean Donnelly: 2008–09
Matt Walker: 2009–10
Aaron Oakley: 2010–11
Kootenay Alder: 2011–12, 2013–14
Ray Woodley: 1986
Frank Romeo: 1987
John Dougan: 1981

Rookie of the Year
Carter Popoff: 2011–12
John Wesley: 2013–14

Most Improved Player
Brad McGowan: 2008–09
Sebastien Pare: 2010–11

Most Inspirational Player
Patrick Hunter: 2010–11
Jeremy Hamaguchi: 2012–13

Coach of the Year
Judd Lambert: 2008–09, 2010–11, 2011–12

Executive of the Year
Doug Paterson: 2010–11

References

External links
Official website of the Richmond Sockeyes

Pacific Junior Hockey League teams
Ice hockey teams in British Columbia
Ice hockey clubs established in 1972
1972 establishments in British Columbia
Defunct British Columbia Hockey League teams
Richmond, British Columbia